Zita-Eva Funkenhauser (born 1 July 1966) is a retired, Romanian-born German foil fencer. In 1984 and 1988 she won two team gold and bronze medal at the Olympics competing for West Germany and a silver competing for Germany.

Funkenhauser is married to Matthias Behr, a 1976 Olympic champion in the foil. Her family belonged to the Satu Mare Swabians.

References

External links
 

1966 births
Living people
German female fencers
German foil fencers
Olympic fencers of West Germany
Olympic fencers of Germany
Fencers at the 1984 Summer Olympics
Fencers at the 1988 Summer Olympics
Fencers at the 1992 Summer Olympics
Olympic gold medalists for West Germany
Olympic bronze medalists for West Germany
Olympic silver medalists for Germany
Olympic medalists in fencing
Sportspeople from Satu Mare
Romanian people of German descent
Medalists at the 1984 Summer Olympics
Medalists at the 1988 Summer Olympics
Medalists at the 1992 Summer Olympics